Ceili  was an Irish priest in the mid-eleventh century. He was Bishop of Ardagh and died in 1048.

References

1048 deaths
Bishops of Ardagh